Nils Althin (12 May 1905 – 19 May 1978) was a Swedish boxer. He competed in the men's welterweight event at the 1932 Summer Olympics.

References

External links
 

1905 births
1978 deaths
Swedish male boxers
Olympic boxers of Sweden
Boxers at the 1932 Summer Olympics
Sportspeople from Malmö
Welterweight boxers
20th-century Swedish people